Chloe Charlotte Hawthorn (born 17 August 2002) is an English actress. She is best known for playing the lead role of Matilda Wormwood in Matilda the Musical, a role she shared with Lucy-Mae Beacock, Hayley Canham, Elise Blake, Cristina Fray and Lara Wollington.

Early life
Hawthorn was born in and currently lives in Essex. She attended dance training at Beverly Marks Stage School. She was a member of Spirit Young Performers Company where she trained in musical theatre. She studied acting in college.

Career
Hawthorn was in the original cast of the West End production of The Wizard of Oz and was featured in the original cast recording. In August 2012, Hawthorn landed the lead role of Matilda in Matilda the Musical, taking over from Cleo Demetriou, Jade Marner, Isobelle Molloy and Eleanor Worthington Cox. In her run, Hawthorn, alongside her fellow Matilda's, became judges on the CBBC and BBC One programme, Junior Masterchef. Hawthorn performed with the cast at the 100th Royal Variety Performance where she performed part of the song "Naughty" and also met the Queen and Prince Philip. She then won the Mousetrap Award for Outstanding Female Performance for her portrayal, becoming one of the youngest people to win the award. She was also nominated for an Olivier Award, alongside her fellow cast members, and was featured in the Oliviers 2013 performance alongside Lara Wollington, Elise Blake and Cristina Fray. Hawthorn finished her run in Matilda on 1 September 2013.

Hawthorn then joined the cast of The BFG landing the lead role of Sophie in 2014 at the Birmingham Repertory Theatre alongside Madeleine Haynes and Lara Wollington, finishing her run in early 2015. In April 2016, Hawthorn announced that she would be joining Spirit Young Performers Company, after attending many workshops, that have received millions of views online and on YouTube.

She made her series debut in 2017, in Campfire Creepers at the Sitges Film Festival in Spain directed by Alexandre Aja and joined by Robert Englund in the cast. It was one of the first ever virtual reality horror series to be made and was released in October 2017 in the Oculus Store.

In 2019, Hawthorn featured in a Sainsbury's Valentines Day advert alongside Sonnyboy Skelton. She then starred as Jenna in the docudrama, Impact of Murder, which premiered in July 2019.

Filmography

Theatre

Television

Video

References 

English stage actresses
English child actresses
Living people
2002 births
People from the London Borough of Havering